N-Formylmorpholine is the organic compound with the formula O(C2H4)2NCHO.  It is the formamide of morpholine (O(C2H4)2NH).  A colorless compound, it is a useful high temperature solvent akin to dimethylformamide. It has been used as a formylating agent.

References

Formamides
Amide solvents
4-Morpholinyl compunds